David Morant (born 24 December 1977), is a Belgian futsal player who plays for Paris Métropole and the Belgian national futsal team.

References

External links
 
 UEFA profile

1977 births
Living people
Futsal goalkeepers
Belgian men's futsal players
Place of birth missing (living people)